The following are the national junior records in Olympic weightlifting in Iran. Records are maintained in each weight class for the snatch lift, clean and jerk lift, and the total for both lifts by the I.R. Iran Weightlifting Federation.

Current records

Men

Women

Historical records

Men (1998 - 2018)

References

Weightlifting in Iran
National records in Olympic weightlifting
Iranian records